There are 36 U.S. Highways that exist entirely or partially in the state of North Carolina. In North Carolina, all U.S. Highways are maintained by the North Carolina Department of Transportation (NCDOT).


U.S. Highways

Alternate routes

Since the 1930s, North Carolina has utilized alternate routes for various needs (business, bypass, or spur). In 1960, the state began utilizing special routes, which converted many alternate routes to business loops. Currently, 15 alternate routes traverse the state; most use the "A" suffix, while a few recent route additions in the eastern half of the state are signed "."

See also

References

External links

U.S. Routes